Wahgunyah is a closed station, located in the town of Wahgunyah, on the Wahgunyah railway line, in Victoria, Australia.

The station officially closed on 10 April 1978.

References

Disused railway stations in Victoria (Australia)